Muharrem Süleymanoğlu (born 18 September 1969) is a Turkish weightlifter. He competed in the men's middleweight event at the 1992 Summer Olympics.

References

1969 births
Living people
Turkish male weightlifters
Olympic weightlifters of Turkey
Weightlifters at the 1992 Summer Olympics
Place of birth missing (living people)
20th-century Turkish people